is a Japanese Odissi dancer. She has lived in India since 1996.

Ono was selected as one of the 100 most respected and outstanding Japanese in the world in their respective fields by the Japanese issue of Newsweek in 2008 and was featured in a documentary series, First Japanese.

Biography
Ono started dancing at the age of 4 under the instructor Masako Yokoi, the only Japanese modern dance graduate from the Martha Graham Dance School in the United States. She also trained in western classical ballet at the Matsuyama Ballet in Tokyo, and studied jazz dance and hip hop at the K-Broadway Dance Center, Tokyo.

In 1996, Ono joined Nrityagram, the dance village in India started by the noted Odissi dancer, Late Protima Gauri, and won a scholarship for her studies. She initially received training in Odissi from Protima and continued her training from Surupa Sen and Bijayini Satpathy after Protima's death. She also attended classes in Yoga, Kalaripayattu and Mayurbhanj Chhau dance, and participated in workshops held at Nrityagram by Wolfgang Theatre, Paul Taylor 2 Company, The Expressions, Asha Coorlawala and Robert Williams.

After five years of training in Odissi and yoga, she left Nrityagram to become a solo performer. She has been living in Orissa, India since then, and received further training in Odissi from the Guru Shri Kelucharan Mohapatra, Guru Ramani Ranjan Jena, and Guru Naba Kishore Mishra.

Since 2001, Ono has been based at Bhubaneswar, India, as a professional Odissi dancer and yoga teacher, collaborating with dancers, musicians and artists from India and abroad. She had her first Manch Pravesh (debut as a soloist) at Habitat Centre in the year 2003 and is now working on her own choreography pieces that are a blend of tantra, yoga and classical Indian dance.

She has performed and given lecture-demonstrations and workshops in India, Japan, United States, Canada, Italy, Sweden, Australia, France, Malaysia, Singapore, Thailand, Indonesia, and Sri Lanka. She has also performed for two Prime Ministers of Japan, Junichiro Koizumi in 2005 and Shinzo Abe in 2006. In 2008, she participated in a contemporary dance project with Boi Shakti and Gerard Mostard.

Ono also trains other Odissi dancers and directs Masako Ono Performing Arts (MOPA) in India and Japan. In 2010, she launched the MUDRA Foundation to support the efforts of international artists working to promote local art and handicrafts.

Works
Pieces choreographed by Masako Ono include Frozen Grace, Dance of the Crane, Divinity Within - Tantrik Prayer, Kundalini Stavah, and The Day Dream.

Professional milestones
 Selected as one of the world's 100 most respected Japanese people in their respective fields by Newsweek Japan in 2008.
 NHK BS 1 produced a documentary film on Masako Ono as part of the First Japanese series in 2007.
 Performed for Junichiro Koizumi and Shinzo Abe, former Prime Ministers of Japan.
 Performed at the Kennedy Center in Washington D.C., USA in 2007.

References

External links
 
 Masako Ono's page on Myspace
 Masako Ono's Blog
 Review in The Hindu, 29 October 2010
 Review in The Deccan Herald, 8 September 2010

Living people
People from Tokyo
Japanese female dancers
Odissi exponents
Performers of Indian classical dance
Japanese expatriates in India
Year of birth missing (living people)